The Mormon Battalion Monument is installed outside the Utah State Capitol in Salt Lake City, in the U.S. state of Utah.

Description and history
Dedicated in 1927, the 100-foot monument is made of rose pink granite and bronze and was sculpted by Gilbert Riswold.

References

External links
 

1927 establishments in Utah
1927 sculptures
Bronze sculptures in Utah
Granite sculptures in the United States
Monuments and memorials in Utah
Outdoor sculptures in Salt Lake City
Sculptures of men in Utah
Statues in Utah